WKIB (96.5 FM, "Mix 96.5") is a Top 40 music formatted radio station licensed to Anna, Illinois, and serving the Cape Girardeau, Missouri, area.  The station's transmitter is located in a rural area north of Cape Girardeau.

External links
 

KIB
Union County, Illinois
Cape Girardeau, Missouri
Contemporary hit radio stations in the United States